Shikolenko is a surname. Notable people with the surname include:

 Natalya Shikolenko (born 1964), Belarusian javelin thrower
 Tatyana Shikolenko (born 1968), Russian-Belarusian javelin thrower